Francisco Vaca Gutiérrez (born July 24, 1951, in Tarija) is a Bolivian politician.

Vaca Gutiérrez studied architecture, and obtained a post-graduate degree from the Universidad Andina in Sucre. He was a municipal councilor in Tarija 1991–1992, and served as interim mayor of the city during the same period. Between 1996 and 1997 he was a councilor of the Tarija Department.

In 1997 he was elected to the Chamber of Deputies, as the Revolutionary Left Front (FRI) candidate in the single-member constituency Nr. 46 (which covers areas of the Cercado province). His alternate was Amado Baldivieso Arroyo.

References

1951 births
Bolivian architects
Members of the Chamber of Deputies (Bolivia)
Mayors of places in Bolivia
Revolutionary Left Front (Bolivia) politicians
Living people
People from Tarija
20th-century Bolivian politicians